Thomas Thompson (8 July 1756 – 10 November 1799) was an Anglican priest in Ireland during the 18th century.

Thompson was born in County Mayo; and educated at Trinity College, Dublin. He was Dean of Killala from 1791796 until his death.

Notes

1756 births
1799 deaths
18th-century Irish Anglican priests
Alumni of Trinity College Dublin
Deans of Killala